Ernest James McDougall (28 September 1885 – 15 March 1963) was an Australian rules footballer who played with South Melbourne in the Victorian Football League (VFL).

A small player, he made his debut late in the 1902 season at the age of 16 and acquitted himself well. He only played four games, all of them before his eighteenth birthday.

After his brief football career McDougall became a dentist, working in Melbourne for three years before moving to London. While in London, he enlisted to serve in the Australian Army Medical Corps in World War I in 1916 and he remained there after being discharged in 1919, working in a private dental practice.

Notes

External links 

1885 births
1963 deaths
Australian rules footballers from Melbourne
Sydney Swans players
Australian military personnel of World War I
Military personnel from Melbourne
Australian dentists